Jérémy Bécasseau (born 18 July 1991) is a rugby union player for Worcester Warriors in the Aviva Premiership.

He plays as a prop. He is 5 foot 10 in height and weights 16 stone.

Worcester signed Jeremy from Stade Francais in June 2013. 
The front rower has previously had playing spells at US Carcassonne in the Pro D2 and was at Dijon in Federale 1 before being given his chance in the Top 14.

References
https://web.archive.org/web/20140517183749/http://www.warriors.co.uk/warriors/matchcentre/players_warriors_first_team.php?player=108232&includeref=dynamic
http://www.worcesternews.co.uk/sport/wrfc/10508983.Front_row_prospect_B__casseau_joins_Warriors/

1991 births
Living people
Worcester Warriors players